Megachile fulvofasciata is a species of bee in the family Megachilidae. It was described by Radoszkowski in 1882.

References

Fulvofasciata
Insects described in 1882